The Dubai Sevens is played annually as part of the IRB Sevens World Series for international rugby sevens (seven-a-side version of rugby union). The 2008 competition was held on November 28 and November 29 at The Sevens, a brand-new facility built to host the 2009 Rugby World Cup Sevens. It was the first of eight events in the 2008-09 IRB Sevens World Series. The top-tier Cup trophy was won by South Africa.

This was the first edition of the Dubai Sevens to be held at The Sevens. Previous editions were held at the Dubai Exiles Rugby Ground.

Format
The tournament consists of four round-robin pools of four teams. All sixteen teams progress to the knockout stage. The top two teams from each group progress to quarter-finals in the main competition, with the winners of those quarter-finals competing in cup semi-finals and the losers competing in plate semi-finals. The bottom two teams from each group progress to quarter-finals in the consolation competition, with the winners of those quarter-finals competing in bowl semi-finals and the losers competing in shield semi-finals.

Teams

Pool stages

Pool A
{| class="wikitable" style="text-align: center;"
|-
!width="200"|Team
!width="40"|Pld
!width="40"|W
!width="40"|D
!width="40"|L
!width="40"|PF
!width="40"|PA
!width="40"|+/-
!width="40"|Pts
|- 
|align=left| 
|3||3||0||0||104||21||+83||9
|- 
|align=left| 
|3||2||0||1||50||62||−12||7
|-
|align=left| 
|3||1||0||2||50||62||−12||5
|-
|align=left| 
|3||0||0||3||31||90||−59||3
|}

Pool B
{| class="wikitable" style="text-align: center;"
|-
!width="200"|Team
!width="40"|Pld
!width="40"|W
!width="40"|D
!width="40"|L
!width="40"|PF
!width="40"|PA
!width="40"|+/-
!width="40"|Pts
|- 
|align=left| 
|3||3||0||0||95||10||+85||9
|- 
|align=left| 
|3||2||0||1||66||38||+28||7
|-
|align=left| 
|3||1||0||2||29||83||−54||5
|-
|align=left| 
|3||0||0||3||21||80||−59||3
|}

Pool C
{| class="wikitable" style="text-align: center;"
|-
!width="200"|Team
!width="40"|Pld
!width="40"|W
!width="40"|D
!width="40"|L
!width="40"|PF
!width="40"|PA
!width="40"|+/-
!width="40"|Pts
|- 
|align=left| 
|3||3||0||0||71||26||+45||9
|- 
|align=left| 
|3||2||0||1||52||33||+19||7
|-
|align=left| 
|3||1||0||2||35||53||−17||5
|-
|align=left| 
|3||0||0||3||26||73||−47||3
|}

Pool D
{| class="wikitable" style="text-align: center;"
|-
!width="200"|Team
!width="40"|Pld
!width="40"|W
!width="40"|D
!width="40"|L
!width="40"|PF
!width="40"|PA
!width="40"|+/-
!width="40"|Pts
|- 
|align=left| 
|3||3||0||0||83||22||+61||9
|- 
|align=left| 
|3||2||0||1||64||40||+24||7
|-
|align=left| 
|3||1||0||2||29||55||−26||5
|-
|align=left| 
|3||0||0||3||34||93||−59||3
|}

Knockout

Shield

Bowl

Plate

Cup

Statistics

Individual points

Individual tries

Notes and references

External links
 IRB Sevens
 Dubai Sevens on irb.com

2009
2008–09 IRB Sevens World Series
2008 in Emirati sport
2008 in Asian rugby union